The Tropaeum Alpium (Latin 'Trophy of the Alps', French: Trophée des Alpes), is a Roman trophy (tropaeum) celebrating the emperor Augustus's decisive victory over the tribes who populated the Alps. The monument's ruins are in La Turbie (France), a few kilometers from the Principality of Monaco.

Construction
The Trophy was built c. 6 BC in honor of Augustus to celebrate his definitive victory over the 45 tribes who populated the Alps. The Alpine populations were defeated during the military campaign to subdue the Alps conducted by the Romans between 16 and 7 BC.

The monument was built of stone from the Roman quarry located about 800 metres away, where traces of sections of carved columns are visible in the stone.

The monument as partially restored is 35 meters high. When built, according to the architect, the base measured 35 meters in length, the first platform 12 meters in height, and the rotunda of 24 columns with its statue of an enthroned Augustus is 49 metres high.

Inscription
One of the stones of the tower contained the names of the tribes. The inscription was only preserved in fragments, but could be reconstructed thanks to the transcription of Pliny the Elder, albeit with minor corrections. It reads:

· TRUMPILINI 
· CAMUNNI 
· VENNONETES 
· VENOSTES 
· ISARCI 
· BREUNI 
· GENAUNES 
· FOCUNATES 

· VINDELICI: 
·· COSUANETES 
·· RUCINATES 
·· LICATES 
·· CATENATES 
· AMBISONTES 
· RUGUSCI 
· SUANETES 
· CALUCONES 
· BRIXENETES 

· LEPONTII 
· UBERI 
· NANTUATES 
· SEDUNI 
· VERAGRI 
· SALASSI 
· ACITAUONES 
· MEDULLI 
· UCENNI 
· CATURIGES 

· BRIGIANI 
· SOGIONTI 
· BRODIONTI 
· NEMALONI 
· EDENATES 
· VESUBIANI 
· VEAMINI 
· GALLITAE 
· TRIULLATI 

· ECDINI 
· VERGUNNI 
· EGUITURI 
· NEMATURI 
· ORATELLI 
· NERUSI 
· VELAUNI 
· SUETRI.

Later life

The monument originally served no military purpose and contained no fortress. Rather, it marked the boundary between Italy and Gallia Narbonensis, later pushed back to the Var River. Between the 12th and 15th centuries, however, the Trophy did become a fortress, with locals building houses around its walls. In 1705, when war broke out between Savoy and France during the War of the Spanish Succession, Louis XIV ordered the destruction of all fortresses in the region, including this one. The partially destroyed Trophy then became a quarry and its stones were used, among other things, to build the nearby church of Saint-Michel.

The monument was partially restored in 1929 with funds from American philanthropist Edward Tuck.

Nearby Roman remains
The Trophy is situated on the Via Julia Augusta, named after Augustus, a continuation of the Via Aurelia which linked Vintimille to Cimiez (Nice). Various fountains within the territory of the communes of Beausoleil and Roquebrune-Cap-Martin are also said to be Roman.

Museums
The Edward Tuck Museum on the site of the Trophy includes fragments, plaster molds, old photographs documenting the monument and its reconstruction. It was built in 1929 and renovated in 2011.

It also includes a 1:20 scale model of the reconstructed Trophy. Another 1:20 scale model is found in Room IX of the Museo della Civiltà Romana in Rome.

See also
Rhaetian people for tribal affiliations of the Raeti

References

External links

Official web site
Trophy of the Alps (site with photos)
Livius.org: La Turbie

6 BC
Buildings and structures completed in the 1st century BC
Ancient Roman buildings and structures in France
Augustan building projects
Victory monuments
History of the Alps
Buildings and structures in Alpes-Maritimes
1st-century BC establishments in Roman Gaul
Monuments of the Centre des monuments nationaux